Davante Lewis is an American politician. He is a member of the Louisiana Public Service Commission from the third district.

Lewis was raised in Lake Charles, Louisiana, by a single mother. He attended McNeese State University and was student body president. He served as a delegate to the 2012 Democratic National Convention while he was enrolled in college. After graduating, Lewis was the director of public affairs and outreach for the Louisiana Budget Project. In 2020, he ran for a seat on the East Baton Rouge Parish's metropolitan council.

In 2022, Lewis ran for the District 3 seat on the Louisiana Public Service Commission. He defeated incumbent fellow Democrat Lambert Boissiere in a runoff to win the election. This made Lewis, who is gay, the first openly LGBTQ person elected to state office in Louisiana.

References

Living people
Louisiana Democrats
Gay politicians
LGBT African Americans
LGBT people from Louisiana
American LGBT politicians
McNeese State University alumni
African-American people in Louisiana politics
Politicians from Lake Charles, Louisiana
Year of birth missing (living people)
Members of the Louisiana Public Service Commission
21st-century LGBT people